Carmona is a Portuguese and Spanish surname. Notable persons with that name include:

 Adriana Carmona (born 1972), Venezuelan taekwondo practitioner
 Alberto Porro Carmona (born 1980), Spanish conductor, composer, author, music lecturer, teacher and saxophonist
 Alejandro Carmona (born 1983), Puerto Rican basketball player
 Andrea Meza Carmona (born 1994), Miss Universe 2020
 Anthony Carmona (born 1953), fifth President of Trinidad and Tobago
 Antonio Carmona Añorve (living), Mexican director of police, current governor of Baja California
 Arthur Paul Carmona (1982-2008), American wrongfully convicted person
 Carlos Carmona (born 1987), Chilean football player 
 Carlos Carmona Bonet (born 1987), Spanish football player
 Carmona Rodrigues (born 1956), Portuguese university professor and politician, grand-nephew of Óscar
 Chango Carmona (born 1944), Mexican boxer
 Fausto Carmona, false name used until 2012 by Roberto Hernández (born 1980), Dominican baseball pitcher 
 Fernando Ocaranza Carmona (1876-1965), Mexican surgeon, university rector and military officer
 Giancarlo Carmona (born 1985), Peruvian football player
 Grégory Carmona (born 1979), French football player
 Irma Carmona, Mexican voice actress
 Juan Antonio Salvador Carmona, Spanish engraver
 Luis Salvador Carmona, Spanish sculptor
 Manuel Salvador Carmona (1734–1820), Spanish engraver and designer
 Nicanor Carmona (1842–1940), Peruvian politician
 Óscar Carmona (1869-1951), President of Portugal, 1926-1951
 Pedro Carmona Estanga (born 1941), Venezuelan businessman, transitional president during the coup attempt of 2002
 Pedro Carmona (Oaxaca), Mexican politician
 Pedro Carmona-Alvarez (born 1972), Chilean novelist, poet and musician
 Pedro Carmona (footballer) (born 1988), Brazilian football player
 Rafael Carmona (born 1972), Puerto Rican baseball player
 Reema Harrysingh-Carmona (born 1970), First Lady of Trinidad and Tobago, of Indo-Trinidadian American heritage
 Richard Carmona (born 1949), American physician, nurse, police officer, public health administrator, and politician
 Rigoberto Romero Carmona (1940-1991), Cuban photographer
 Robert Carmona-Borjas, Venezuelan lawyer, academic and writer
 Salvador Carmona (born 1975), Mexican football player
 Víctor Rolando Arroyo Carmona, Cuban geographer and journalist
 Walter Carmona (born 1957), Brazilian judoka

Spanish-language surnames
Portuguese-language surnames